Rogue Elk is an unincorporated community in Jackson County, Oregon, United States. It lies along Oregon Route 62 and the Rogue River between Shady Cove and Prospect. Elk Creek enters the river at Rogue Elk.

Rogue Elk County Park is by the river. This  park offers river access,  fishing, rafting, swimming, and picnicking. It has riverfront campsites as well as sites for recreational vehicles (RVs) with hookups for water and electricity. Amenities include restrooms, showers, barbecues, a playground, and a two-lane boat ramp, which is open year-round. The campground is generally open from mid-March to late October.

References

Unincorporated communities in Jackson County, Oregon
Unincorporated communities in Oregon